This is a list of university A cappella musical groups in the UK who have achieved some level of notability or recognition.

University of Aberdeen

Aberpella
Aberpella are the original University of Aberdeen's A cappella ensemble. They were founded in 2011 as the AUSA (Aberdeen University Student Association) A Cappella Society by Nathan Chadwick. They were semi-finalists at the Voice Festival UK 2015, Voice Festival UK 2017 and ICCA 2017.

In 2015, Aberpella and their sister group The Killer Quines recorded their first professional EP  - "3000 And Counting". In 2017 Aberpella recorded their first solo EP - "50 Tones of Grey".

The group also performed a week long run of their 2016/17 repertoire at the Edinburgh Fringe Festival under the title "Aberpella Presents: 50 Tones of Grey"

In 2019, Aberpella placed second at the Scottish A Cappella Championships, and were also the only mixed-gender group to place.

The Killer Quines
The Killer Quines are an all-female A cappella group at the University of Aberdeen. Founded in 2013 by Joanna Casson, the name derives from the doric dialect commonly used in Aberdeenshire where 'quine' translates as 'girl'. The group covers songs in a range of musical styles from pop, indie, folk, jazz, soul, gospel, to classical. Since the group's emergence, they have competed in the Scottish A Cappella Championships. In 2015, the group got through to the semi-finals at a Voice Festival UK in Glasgow, and in 2017 to the quarterfinals of the International Championship of Collegiate A Cappella. The Killer Quines are frequently invited to perform at local events at various venues across Scotland, including an International Women's Day event (2014), a University of Aberdeen LGBTQ event (2015), and Maggie's cancer charity in Glasgow (2016), as well as hosting their own concerts in Aberdeen city.

Chordiac Arrest
Chordiac Arrest were formed in the summer of 2011 by a group of medical students. Although they have performed at some events in Aberdeen, most recently being joint winners of the open Vocal Group class (V21) in the Aberdeenshire Music Festival, they have never entered the Voice Festival UK. They disbanded in the summer of 2012, as final year of medicine spread the group far and wide on rural placements. However a reunion of six members formed GCS-3 (the Gangster Coma Scales - 3) who performed at a Christmas Concert in 2012, with the American group Pentatonix as their inspiration.

In addition to this group something of an A cappella revolution occurred at the medical school and two more groups started towards the end of 2012, namely The Ultrasounds and A Patella, under the guidance of Tim Lewis.

University of Bath

The Alley Barbers
The longest-running vocal group at Bath University, The Alley Barbers sing a wide range of songs in four part harmony, often in the barbershop style. Current conductor and former student member, Tim Greeves, succeeded the director of student music-making, Robin Jackson, on his retirement in 2005. The founder of Bristol University's TUBBS A Cappella was a member of the Alley Barbers from 2000 to 2001.

Aquapella
Aquapella are the University of Bath's first contemporary A cappella group. Founded by Civil Engineering student Andrew Hakes in 2011, they competed in the Voice Festival UK for the first time in 2012. Since then, they have released an EP Lambda in 2016, won the UK ICCA finals in 2017 and VoiceFest UK in 2018. They embarked on their first UK tour, I Wouldn't Be, in 2017/2018.

Bath Spa University

No Direction
No Direction are a six-part all-male A cappella vocal ensemble who started in late 2012, and are the university's best acknowledged A cappella/barbershop group. The group formed during rehearsals for the university's production of The Magic Flute by Mozart, and since then have played in several venues around Bath. They have become well known for their comedic style, with several arrangements written by group members. Their repertoire has an extensive range, from classic, well-known songs such as 'The Longest Time' by Billy Joel to more modern songs such as 'Tribute' by Tenacious D and others, including some contemporary rap songs.

University of Birmingham 
The University of Birmingham's A cappella society, A Cappella Birmingham, currently has seven groups - two all-female, and seven mixed. One former group at the university - The Sons of Pitches - has since become an external group, and performs professionally.

The Sons of Pitches 

The Sons of Pitches is an all-male A cappella group formed in October 2010 by Mark Nathan. In 2011, they took part in the inaugural Birmingham semifinal of the Voice Festival UK. In 2012, they won the Birmingham semifinal of Voice Festival UK, and competed at the final in London. They returned to the London finals again in 2013 where they received more awards than any other group in the competition, being recognised for 'Outstanding Arrangement', 'Outstanding Vocal Percussion', 'Outstanding Choreography/Stagecraft' and 'Outstanding Performance', but ultimately lost overall to Vive from Guildhall. However, just a few weeks later The Sons of Pitches won the 'International Wildcard Round' of the International Championships of Collegiate A Cappella (ICCA), and competed in the International Finals at The Town Hall, New York City, on 20 April 2013.

In September and October 2015 The Sons of Pitches were one of the A cappella groups who appeared in the Gareth Malone BBC television series, The Naked Choir. The choir won the competition.

The Uptone Girls 
The Birmingham Songbirds was an all-female A cappella group. In 2012 they reached the Birmingham semifinal of the Voice Festival UK. Later that year, they changed their name to 'The Uptone Girls'.

Former Groups 

Augmented Seven was a mixed-voice A cappella group from the University of Birmingham formed in 2010 by Tom Johnson and Mark Nathan. They were University of Birmingham's first A cappella group and only mixed group.
In 2011, the group entered the Voice Festival UK at the inaugural Birmingham semifinal, and progressed to the final after winning the 'Outstanding Performance' award.
Later that year, the group split up due to artistic differences. Three of its male members went on to join the second incarnation of The Sons of Pitches from 2011 to 2012. This group has since disbanded.

The Lorelites was an all-female a cappella group formed in January 2011. In 2011 they took part in the first Birmingham semifinal of the Voice Festival UK. Now defunct.

University of Bristol

Academy 
Academy are the university's all-male-identifying a cappella group formed in 2015 by Nick Jones. The group is known for their fun, crowd-pleasing stage presence and creative arrangements. In the summer of 2017, Academy appeared on Sky One's "Sing: Ultimate A Cappella", opening the first episode. In 2018, their first year of competing and Jones' first year as music director, Academy progressed to the ICCA UK Final in London's New Wimbledon Theatre. Later in the same year, Academy reached the semifinals of the Voice Festival UK. In August 2018, Academy made their Edinburgh Fringe debut performing the joint show "Academy and Pitch Fight present: Buy One, Get One Free" alongside their sister group Pitch Fight. In December 2018, Academy released their first single and music video, Jones' arrangement of LunchMoney Lewis' "Bills", which featured in their 2018 ICCA set. The group reached the ICCA UK final again in 2019, their second year entering the competition, with beatboxer Cem Rifat winning Outstanding Vocal Percussion at the quarterfinal stage. In 2020 Academy recorded and released their debut album "Exhibit A".  The album went on to receive 5 CARA nominations, including 2 for their version of Mark Ronson's Bang Bang Bang. The group went on to win the CARA for Best Lower Voices Collegiate Song, and came runner-up for Best Debut Scholastic Album.

All Sharps 

All Sharps (formerly known as HotTUBBS) was an auditioned A cappella group partially-contained within TUBBS A Cappella. Formed in 2008, they have won medals at the Manchester Amateur Choral Competition and Oxford Music Festival. They had also been semi-finalists in Voice Festival UK twice: in 2012 and in 2015. HotTUBBS rebranded at the end of 2017 to become All Sharps.

The Bristol Suspensions 
The Bristol Suspensions are a mixed voice A cappella group formed in October 2014 by Joe Pickin, Eve Robertson, and Rafaella Barratt. In their first year of existence, they performed in the Voice Festival 2015, released a hit music video, sang on BBC Radio, recorded an album, and brought a show to the Edinburgh Fringe, with a sell-out final night. In their second year, they placed third in the ICCA semifinals, as well as achieving an award for Outstanding Arrangement in Aliak Bedirian's 'Madness/Magic' and Outstanding Vocal Percussion for Scott Lechleiter, and in 2016 won the Voice Festival UK university competition. In 2017, the group completed a US Tour and performed on BBC One's Pitch Battle and released their debut album Landmark. For three consecutive years (2017-2019), the group have placed in the top three groups at the ICCA UK Finals and were runner-up in 2019 (missing first place by one point). From 2018-2019, the group have won special awards for 'Outstanding Choreography' and 'Outstanding Vocal Percussion' two years in a row awarded to Performance Directors: Sam Walter (2018/9) and Alessia Doyle (2019) and Vocal Percussionists: James Dempsey (2018/9) and Jonny Simon (2018/9) respectively. In 2019, The Bristol Suspensions celebrated the group's 5th birthday with a 'Five Year Anniversary Show' where all previous generations of the group came back to perform in a reunion concert alongside the incumbent group. The fifth generation of the group released an EP of their 2019 ICCA set, titled 'Testament' and won the Irish International A Cappella Festival. In the 2021 virtual edition of ICCA, the group progressed to the international final of the competition with their version of "The Heartburn Song" by Lawrence, picking up awards for Vocal Percussion, Arrangement and Audio Mixing on the way.

The Bristones/Top Note/The Tone Rangers (formerly known as TUBBS A Cappella) 

The University of Bristol Barbershop Singers was a society formed in 2007 at the University of Bristol by Iain Hallam, from an earlier quartet, to act as an umbrella group supporting "non-classical" A cappella singing. There were three main unauditioned choruses (for upper, lower and mixed voices) and the auditioned chorus listed below, plus numerous quartets and smaller ensembles. Several member quartets have competed at the national barbershop finals, with Park Street and Patchwork qualifying to represent the UK at international competitions. In 2014, Park Street became the National Barbershop Quartet Champions. Following their Edinburgh Fringe show 'Cheap Trills' in 2017, TUBBS A Cappella was rebranded as three new unauditioned groups: The Bristones (mixed voices), Top Note (upper voices) and The Tone Rangers (lower voices).

Pitch Fight 
Pitch Fight are a 14-piece all female identifying competitive A cappella group formed in 2015. In 2016 they competed in the VoiceFest. They have appeared on national television in Sky One's "Sing: Ultimate A Cappella" and became runners up in the ICCA 2018 Exeter Quarterfinal, having also picked up awards for Catt Hurman's "Outstanding Choreography" and Äyanna Christie-Brown's "Outstanding Solo". They then went on to place fourth in the ICCA UK Final 2018, again winning the "Outstanding Soloist" award and just two weeks later became VoiceFest 2018 finalists. In August 2018 they debuted at the Edinburgh Festival Fringe alongside their brother group Academy A Cappella with their joint show "Academy and Pitch Fight present: Buy One, Get One Free" which was sold out for its final two performances. In 2019, Pitch Fight once again qualified for the ICCA UK Final by placing as Runners Up in the Exeter Quarterfinal, along with picking up the "Outstanding Choreography" award for the second year in a row. Pitch Fight are returning to the Edinburgh fringe in August 2019 with their aca-brothers, Academy, to perform "Romeo & Juliet: An A Capella Tragedy". In 2020 they recorded their first EP, Purple Reign, which released on the 26 September. The group placed third in the UK semifinal of the virtual ICCA in 2021, receiving the award for "Outstanding Choreography" at Quarterfinals for the third consecutive year.

Brunel University

BUBS 
The Brunel University Barbershop Singers (BUBS) are a group of experienced male soloists who sing together as a barbershop group throughout the academic year in both public events and an array of concerts on behalf of Brunel University London.

University of Cambridge

Cadenza 
Cadenza is a mixed-voice group formed originally in 1997 as a small jazz choir, complete with conductor and band, which was changed in 2002 to its present setup as a smaller close harmony A cappella group.

In March 2011, the group won the Voice Festival UK and travelled to New York to compete in the ICCA final in April 2011. They did not place in the top three.

In January 2012, it was confirmed that Cadenza would not be competing in the Voice Festival UK in 2012, thus becoming the first ever group not to try and retain their title.

Fitz Barbershop 
Fitz Barbershop is an all-male A cappella group that used to accept only members from Fitzwilliam College but now is open to members of all colleges. Having been founded in 1994 by Alex Tester, the then Organ Scholar for Fitzwilliam Chapel Choir, it is the oldest currently-running A cappella group in Cambridge.
At Christmas 2009, they went to Berlin to busk at the Christmas markets, and were featured on the German 24-hour news channel.

In 2009, the group entered the inaugural Voice Festival UK competition in the Cambridge semifinal. They won the award for 'Outstanding Musicality' for Wonderful Tonight. In 2010 they entered again, winning the award for 'Outstanding Performance' and the 'Ward Swingle Award for Originality', gifting them a wild card into the London final. They went on to claim the 'Outstanding Performance' award again in the final.

They frequently perform at Cambridge May Balls, and have on occasion hosted one night events at the ADC Theatre. In March 2014 the group put on a 20th anniversary concert alongside the Fitz Sirens at Fitzwilliam College.

The Fitz Sirens 
The Fitz Sirens is an all-female A cappella group affiliated to Fitzwilliam College. It has performed at many prestigious venues, including 10 Downing Street and The House of Lords.

In 2010, the group reached the final of the Voice Festival UK, where they won the award for 'Outstanding Musicality'.

Blue Shakti 
Blue Shakti is a mixed voice Hindi/English fusion A cappella group. It was formed in 2010 and has performed at various events in and around Cambridge, including society balls and Mastana, an annual cultural show organised by students.

The King's Men 
Formerly known as "Collegium Regale", The King’s Men is the close harmony group formed from the Choral Scholars of the Choir of King’s College, Cambridge. The group has been running for more than 80 years.

The King’s Men functions separately from the main Choir (most famous for the broadcast of the Festival of Nine Lessons and Carols on the radio at Christmas) and is run entirely by the members of the group itself. It performs regularly around Britain, and has performed as far afield as North America, Australia and Hong Kong.

Cardiff University 
Cardiff University A Cappella society was established in 2013 and currently has five groups: Acappellads, Acatude, DeciBelles, InterChorus and Vox. Cardiff University A Cappella Society performs two showcases a year (Winter and Spring) and gig/busk throughout the year. The society has also been booked for weddings. In 2019, the society had a membership of 116 across the groups, making them a large society at Cardiff University for the first time in their five-year history.

Competitive Groups

Acappellads

Acappellads are an all-male A Cappella group and were the first group formed within the Cardiff University A Cappella society. The group qualified for the UK ICCA Semifinals in both 2019 and 2020. Arrangements include "How Long/Attention" (Charlie Puth), "Hit Me Baby One More Time" (Britney Spears), Weathered (Jack Garratt) and "Watercolour/Crush/Propane Nightmares" (Pendulum).

DeciBelles

DeciBelles are a small all female A cappella group from Cardiff University. DeciBelles perform a range of songs arranged by members of the group, and like performing songs about female empowerment. Current arrangements include; Almost Human (Rag'n'Bone man), Salute (Little Mix), Superlove (Andreya Triana) and more. In 2019, the DeciBelles came third in their ICCA quarterfinal in Exeter, becoming the first Welsh group to qualify for the ICCA semi finals. They also reached the ICCA semi finals in 2020. The group released their debut EP, "Watch Your Back" in May 2021.

Vox
Vox are a small mixed voice A cappella group from Cardiff University currently consisting of fourteen members. Vox perform a range of songs, arranged by members of the group. Current arrangements include "Fading into Grey" (Billy Lockett), "Mistakes" (Andra Day), "Palo Santo" (Years And Years), and many others. Vox have now qualified for the ICCA quarterfinals three times, in 2018, 2019 and 2020.

University of Durham

Northern Lights

Northern Lights are a mixed voice A cappella group from Durham University who perform a wide range of genres. The group was formed as Palatinotes in 2013 and in their first year they performed at the 2014 Edinburgh Fringe Festival. In 2015 they released their first single, 'Dancing in the Moonlight', reached the semi-finals of the ICCAs and returned to the Edinburgh Fringe with sell-out performances of their show, 'The Northern Lights Display'.

In 2016 they competed again in the ICCAs, in which they came fourth in the UK, after winning both 'Outstanding Soloist' and 'Outstanding Vocal Percussion' in their quarterfinal heat. In August 2016 they released an EP, 'Bright Lights Small City' and a music video, 'Don't Look Back in Anger', before returning to the Edinburgh Fringe for a third run with their show, 'The Voice Awakens'.

Northern Lights were the winners of the Northern regional final of the 2017 ICCAs, once again taking home 'Outstanding Soloist' and 'Outstanding Vocal Percussion'. They released their second music video, 'Bird Set Free' that summer and took their show 'Fantastic Beats and Where to Find Them' to the Fringe.

In 2018 Northern Lights placed third in the UK Final of the ICCAs after winning the Northern quarterfinal heat and receiving 'Outstanding Soloist' and 'Outstanding Arrangement'. They have recorded their second EP and third music video.

In 2020, Northern Lights placed 2nd in the UK Finals after winning the Northern quarterfinal for the 5th time in a row and received 'Outstanding Soloist'.

In 2022, they placed 3rd in the UK Finals after winning their quarterfinal and received 'Outstanding Arrangement' and 'Outstanding Soloist' once again.

The group have performed at the Edinburgh Fringe for the last 6 years and will be returning again in August 2022.

University of Edinburgh

Licence to Trill 
Licence to Trill is the University of Edinburgh's only all-female competitive A Cappella group. They were formed in 2016 and consist of 15 members.

In 2017, they were placed second at their first Scottish A Cappella Championships and won a place at the Voice Festival UK Final in the same year. In 2019, Licence to Trill won the Scottish A Cappella Championships. Vocal coach and Judge, Jennifer John, praised the group on their vocal blend, together with tight choreography and ability to convey their passion and close bond to the audience.

Licence to Trill released their first EP 'Red is the New Black' in March 2019.

Tone Up 
Tone Up are the University of Edinburgh's only mixed A Cappella group, forming in 2016. They were selected for the Voice Festival UK Final in 2017, where they won several 'Outstanding' awards including 'Outstanding Overall Performance' and 'Outstanding Soloist.'

In 2018, Tone Up were placed fourth in the ICCA UK Final overall. At the 2019 Scottish A Cappella Championship, Tone Up won both the 'Outstanding Soloist' and 'Outstanding Arrangement' award.

Tone Up released a music video to their first single 'New York,' which was nominated for two A Cappella Video Awards at the Los Angeles A Cappella Festival.

Cloud IX 
Cloud IX is the University of Edinburgh's only all-male competitive A Cappella group, formed in 2017 (usually) consisting of 9 members.

In 2021, they were placed third in the Scottish A Cappella Championships and won the best video award. By beating all other Scottish all-male A Cappella groups, they had won the title 'Scotland's Premier All-Male A Cappella Group'. After placing third, the group had placed new efforts on placing higher in future competitions.

In 2022, they managed to do this and placed second in the Scottish A Cappella Championships thanks to the efforts of the group's three MDs: Ruari Fraser, Daniel Larbi and Daniel Kozma-Percy. Furthermore, the group won the 'Best Arrangement Award' for Daniel Larbi's beautiful rendition of Still Fighting It - Ben Folds.

University of Exeter

Sweet Nothings 

Sweet Nothings is an all-female group from Exeter University. They were formed in 2006 and as such are the oldest group at the university. In 2009, they competed in the inaugural Voice Festival UK competition and in 2012 they competed again, winning an award for 'Outstanding Performance' in the Bristol regional round.

They have competed twice in the semi-finals of the International Championship of Collegiate A Cappella and three times at the Voice Festival UK, winning the award for 'Outstanding Vocal Percussion' in 2016.

In May 2015 they recorded their first ever 5-track EP titled 'Unwrapped' with The Vocal Company. They performed their first show at the 2014 Edinburgh Festival Fringe named 'Go Sweet or Go Home' and returned with 'Unwrapped' (2015), 'We Need To Talk' (2016) and in 2017 turned the tables (being an all female group) and sang songs traditionally sung by men in their show 'Who Run the World?'.  In 2018 they performed 'Sweet Nothings Live at the Edinburgh Fringe!' and in 2019 'Ocean's 9'. The coronavirus pandemic of 2020 closed down all Edinburgh Festival performances and tourism but Sweet Nothings returned in 2021 with their show 'Now That's What I Call Timeless' and again in 2022 with 'A Night at the Movies'.

In August 2015, they released their first charity single titled 'Telephone', a mash up of Beyoncé & Lady GaGa's 'Telephone' and Lady GaGa's 'Just Dance'
Through the Summer of 2016, Sweet Nothings was selected to participate in the Gareth Malone's BBC 2 program "The Choir: Gareth's Best in Britain" which was aired in November–December 2016, seen by audiences of ten million people.

Semi-Toned

Semi-Toned is an all-male contemporary A cappella group who sing a variety of modern and classic songs. They were formed in October 2010 by Eddie Henley, Jon Minter and Simon Eaton.

They competed for the first time in The Voice Festival UK in 2012, winning both "Outstanding Arrangement" and "Outstanding Vocal Percussion". In 2013 the group won the South West regional, advancing to the London final, as well as "Outstanding Stagecraft and Choreography" and, once more, "Outstanding Vocal Percussion".
Semi-Toned made their Edinburgh Fringe debut in 2013. Their show "The Exe-Men" was reviewed enthusiastically in a Fringe that was not kind to A cappella groups.

In 2014, the group once again reached the final of The Voice Festival UK and winning awards for "Outstanding Arrangement" for their mash-up of "Dear Darlin'" by Olly Murs and "The Fox (What Does The Fox Say?)" by Ylvis, "Outstanding Overall Performance" and "Outstanding Soloist" for Michael Luya in "Motion Picture Soundtrack" by Radiohead. They then continued their Edinburgh Fringe success with 2014's "Toned Up" which saw a second five-star review from Broadway Baby and a prestigious "Bobby" Award, the group becoming the first University ensemble and first A cappella group to achieve this. In September the group recorded its first self-titled 5-track EP with The Vocal Company, featuring covers of John Newman, Daft Punk, Paolo Nutini, Jay Z and Radiohead.

In January 2015, Semi-Toned competed in the Semi-Finals of the ICCA's in London, finishing in second place overall, whilst winning "Outstanding Choreography". Then in April, Semi-Toned won The Voice Festival UK as well as "Outstanding Overall Performance" thereby fully establishing itself upon the UK A cappella scene. Soon after they embarked on their first tour of the East Coast of the United States, visiting and performing with groups from Colombia, NYU, Princeton, Yale and North Eastern College

Harmonics A Cappella
Harmonics A Cappella (formerly Harmonics) was formed in October 2012 by Charlotte Sidwell and Zoe Fitzsimmons. As the only auditioned mixed classical and contemporary a cappella group at the University of Exeter, they perform both classical pieces and contemporary pieces with a slightly more classical feel. Unlike the other auditioned groups at the university, they do not compete; instead focussing on performing their varied repertoire at a professional standard, as well as recording and releasing songs on major streaming services. They have a tradition of busking annually at Christmas to raise money for a group-chosen charity.

Harmonics A Cappella released their first CD in December 2014, "Christmas With Harmonics". The group has since released multiple singles via streaming services. For example, they recorded Eric Whitacre’s ‘Sleep’ in November 2019.

Harmonics A Cappella became an official Exeter Guild affiliated society in August 2020. On 21 December 2020 they released a Christmas EP, titled O Night Divine, comprising five songs recorded remotely during lockdown.

The Bluebelles

The Bluebelles are Exeter University's newest all-female A cappella group. Formed in September 2013 the Bluebelles are an all-female group that started out focusing on jazz and barbershop-style music, however have recently moved towards a more contemporary repertoire. They perform a wide variety of genres, and have performed at the Edinburgh Festival Fringe since 2015. The group also released their debut EP "Double Denim" on 8 August 2018.

Illuminations
Illuminations are a mixed A cappella group, formed by Emily Botsford and Charlotte Mckeown in October 2011, who sing music ranging from modern pop to rock classics. In their 2012-2013 season the group performed for BBC's Children in Need and competed in their first Voice Festival UK, receiving a personal commendation for stagecraft. They competed in the ICCA quarter-finals competition 2016 at Exeter University, winning Best Soloist for Izzie Ballentine-Dykes' rendition of Regina Spector's 'The Call', arranged by Abigail Green. They regularly perform at local venues such as the Old Firehouse and John Gandy's open mic nights where they also won first prize during early 2016.

The group went on to place second at the 2017 South West quarter finals ICCA's, competing in the UK final at Wimbledon Theatre, London. Illuminations began their Edinburgh Fringe debut the same year, performing to a sell-out audience in their show, 'A Pitchpipers Guide to the Melody'. Not only did they debut their first Fringe show in 2017, but they also competed on the Sky One show 'Sing: Ultimate A cappella', reaching the final round and placing second in their heat. The group continues to grow musically and returned to Edinburgh in 2018 to perform a second Fringe show 'By Process Of Illumination' and will be releasing an EP and music video in the Summer.  In 2019 they performed their third   Edinburgh Fringe show 'Minds Alight'. The coronavirus pandemic of 2020 closed down all Edinburgh Festival performances and tourism but Illuminations returned in 2021 with their show 'Somebody Special - The Aca-Betrayal' and again in 2022 with 'The 11th Hour'. The group currently has twelve members (as of 2021), ranging from first to fourth years.

 They post frequently on Instagram where they showcase their current songs and group events https://www.instagram.com/exeterilluminations/

Former Groups 
The Madrigals are a mixed A cappella group from Exeter University formed in 2008 by Ben Pennington. They specialise in singing madrigals. The group has since disbanded.

Hoi Rhapsodoi are a mixed A cappella octet from Exeter University. Formed in 2008 by Erika Borley and Tom Simpson, they sing a huge mix of secular and sacred music. The group has since disbanded in 2016.

University of Glasgow

Choral Stimulation 
Choral Stimulation is a mixed-voice A cappella group from the University of Glasgow formed in 2008. Since 2010, they have competed in the Voice Festival UK at the St Andrews semifinal. In 2011, they won the award for 'Outstanding Performance' for their arrangement entitled "Night at the Movies", which incorporated theme tunes from several Hollywood blockbusters, including The Lord of the Rings, Star Wars and Pirates of the Caribbean. Became the first group outside of St Andrews to win the VF-UK Regional for Scotland in 2013 to go on to compete in London as well as picking up the award for 'Outstanding Arrangement'.

In September and October 2015 Choral Stimulation were one of eight groups who appeared in the BBC television series, The Naked Choir, after auditions from 400 groups from across the UK.

Imperial College London

The Techtonics 
The Techtonics is an all-male A cappella group from Imperial College London formed in the summer of 2008 by Christian Carter and Ed Brightman. The group became an immediate success on campus, coming second on Imperial Idol 2009, and appearing alongside Athlete and Noel Fielding at Imperial's Summer Ball that year.

In 2010, they participated in the Cambridge semifinal of the Voice Festival UK, and Carter received the award for 'Outstanding Arrangement' of Robbie Williams' "Come Undone". The following year, they competed in the newly formed London semifinal, and won the award for 'Outstanding Performance'.

The group took a show to the Edinburgh Festival Fringe for a week in the summer of 2010 and sold out on their final performance. They recorded an album in 2010 and regularly busk on Portobello Road on a Saturday morning.

Between 28 August and 4 September 2011, the group embarked upon a tour of Croatia alongside the Imperial College Chamber Choir, and competed in the Vocal Marathon A cappella competition. They were described as "setting the audience on fire" and bringing a "fresh and positive energy" to the competition.

The group competed in the London Regional Round of the Voice Festival UK 2012, claiming awards for 'Outstanding Performance' and 'Outstanding Soloist'.

The Techtonics won the International Championship of Collegiate A Cappella in 2016, becoming the first non-US group to ever hold the title.

The group returned to the ICCA in 2020, placing third in the UK Semifinal. In the 2021 virtual running of ICCA, The Techtonics placed second in the UK, receiving awards for best audio mixing along the way.

Imperielles 
Formed in 2011, Imperielles  are Imperial's most established all-female A cappella group. They won the award for Outstanding Soloist at the international semi-finals of the International Championship of Collegiate A Cappella (ICCAs) in 2015 and competed in Voice Festival UK in March 2012 and 2014.

The Scopes 
The Scopes is a mixed group, formed in 2011. They have since competed in Voice Festival UK in 2013 and 2014. They were ICCA semi-finalists in 2015 and 2016.

Harmaphrodite 
Harmaphrodite were formed in 2006 by Jessica Gillingwater. The group is no longer in existence but performed at Exhibition Road Music Day in 2006 and 2007. They competed in the Voice Festival 2011 in the London Regional Round.

Apex Beats 
Apex Beats are a group of medical students formed in 2009. They perform mainly at ICSMSU events and perform a mixture of classic Barbershop, A cappella pop songs and Bollywood classics.

King's College London

All The King's Men 
All The King's Men is the first and only all-male A cappella group from King's College, London. They were formed by freshers in September 2009, and went on to have a sell-out run at the Edinburgh Festival Fringe in 2010.

In 2011, they entered the Voice Festival UK and won their regional round, also claiming the award for 'Outstanding Musicality'. In the final, they won the award for 'Outstanding Performance' with their mashup of Boogie Nights and I Don't Feel Like Dancin'. In the summer of that year, they returned to the Edinburgh Festival Fringe.

On 11 February 2012 they won the London Regional round of Voice Festival UK for the second year running. They were also awarded the prize for Outstanding Choreography.

In February 2012 the group toured the West Coast of America performing at many universities including Claremont, USC, UC Stanford and UC Berkeley.

On 10 March 2012 All the King's Men won the Final of Voice Festival UK. They also won the award for Outstanding Musicality in their arrangement of Hallelujah.

The group dissolved in 2020.

The Rolling Tones 
The Rolling Tones is an all-female A cappella group from King's College London. Formed in 2007 by Alice Whiteley, the group has since been invited to perform at a number of significant events, including the opening and closing ceremonies of the London 2012 Olympics and the RBS International Women's Day Event 2014. The Tones have performed several successful sets at the Brandenburg Choral Festival and continue to sing at various events across London.

In 2014, the group reached the semi-finals of The Voice Festival UK and in 2015, they reached the finals, becoming the first all-female A cappella group to reach the deciding stage of the competition since 2009. The group was awarded the prize for 'Outstanding Arrangement' at both the semi-finals and finals for Zara Tso's arrangement of 'Awake My Soul', originally performed by Mumford & Sons.

University of Leeds

The Songsmiths
The Songsmiths are a mixed A cappella group from the University of Leeds'. They have performed at the British Heart Foundation Ball, various University Union events and at the Riley and JCR Awards. They have been very successful in the Voice Festival UK competitions; in 2012 winning Best Arrangement and in 2013 winning Best Soloist and Best Musicality. They reached the quarter finals of the ICCAs in 2017, their first year in the competition, and the semi-finals in 2018. In 2019, the group progressed to the UK Final of the ICCAs and came 3rd overall. Following on from this success the group took their first show ‘10 Things I Hate About A Cappella’ to the Edinburgh Festival Fringe and sold out their entire run. UK"Taking A Cappella to unreachable levels of intimacy" - The Songsmiths (2013)

The Cosmopolitones
The Cosmopolitones are an all-female A cappella group from the University of Leeds'. Formed in 2014, they have grown in a short time, reaching the ICCA Quarterfinals in 2017 and 2018, winning awards for Best Arrangement. In 2018 they also made their debut at Voice Festival UK. They are currently on a break, combining their members with The Songsmiths ahead of their competition bid this year and debut Edinburgh Fringe Festival run in August 2019

University of Manchester

Alvarium 

Alvarium is a mixed-voice A Cappella group, representing the University of Manchester at national and international competitions. Founded in 2016 as "Fantastic Beats and Where to Find Them" by Jamie Davis, Alvarium is the only auditioned group and the only competition group of the University of Manchester's A Cappella and Beatboxing Society (UMACABS). After winning Battle of The Societies in 2017, a competition organised by the University of Manchester Students' Union, and reaching the finals of The Voice Festival UK in 2018, they started to compete internationally in competitions such as the International Championship of Collegiate A Cappella. They changed their name from Fantastic Beats and Where to Find them to Alvarium in 2019; Alvarium denoting beehive - a reference to the worker bee symbol of Manchester.

In March 2021, Alvarium released their first music video titled "Be My Strange Addiction".

Besides competing, Alvarium have performed in charity fundraisers, philanthropy events, society showcases, and other events. They are currently in the progress of making their first EP.

Although existing for nearly five years, the group has only had two musical directors; Courtney Levy (former MD) and Maurits Bekkers (current MD).

University of Manchester's A Cappella and Beatboxing Society 

The University of Manchester's A Cappella and Beatboxing Society (UMACABS) was founded in 2015, and has since grown to over 100 members across different groups: "Alvarium" (formerly known as "Fantastic Beats and Where to Find Them"), "Amplify", "Tone Deft", "Real Hymn Shady's", "Duly Noted" and "Licence to Trill". UMACABS hosts an A cappella showcase every December and May, in which all groups perform covers of popular songs. Performances from the showcase are recorded and uploaded to the society's YouTube channel. Aside from the showcase, individual groups organise and perform at external concerts, such as university events, corporate functions and charity fundraisers.

Manchester University Barbershop Singers 
The Manchester University Barbershop Singers (MUBS) originally started in 2010 as a men's chorus and became a full University of Manchester Students' Union society in 2013 with the addition of a ladies' chorus. The names of the two choruses are Mantunian Way and Ultraviolet, respectively.

Since 2014, Mantunian Way has competed in the yearly British Association of Barbershop Singers Chorus competition, obtaining third place overall in 2014. Mantunian Way obtained seventh overall place in the 2016 Harrogate BABS Chorus competition as well as the Jim Carter trophy for best small chorus.

Members of Ultraviolet have competed in the Ladies Association of British Barbershop Singers chorus competition as part of Chrystal Chords in 2015 .

Sing It! Society 
Sing It! are a mixed A capella chorus set up by University of Manchester students in 2016. The chorus is open to non-university members, is non-auditioned and has a diverse mix of people. They perform a range of music including jazz, folk and barbershop. Their first competition outing was in the 2017 British Association of Barbershop Singers Mixed Chorus competition in Bournemouth, where they achieved a very respectable score for a chorus only eight months in existence.

University of Nottingham

RadioOctave 
RadioOctave is a mixed A cappella group from the University of Nottingham. Formed in 2014, it was the first A cappella group from the university. In 2016, RadioOctave competed at The Voice Festival UK for the first time, reaching the semi-finals.

In 2016, RadioOctave appeared on Gareth Malone's The Choir: Best in Britain, competing in the Midlands and Wales category.

The group also performed at the Women's Cricket World Cup Semi-Final in Derby in 2017

In 2021, RadioOctave became the first a cappella group from Nottingham to qualify for the ICCA UK finals with their rendition of Boogie Wonderland, earning a place in the top 8 UK a cappella groups.  Furthermore, in 2021, RadioOctave were awarded 2nd place in the National University Choir Competition.  RadioOctave continued their successful streak by again qualifying for the ICCA UK finals in 2022. That year they also featured on a BBC East Midlands News programme publicising their Edinburgh Fringe show, Ages of Icons, and performed at Splendour Festival, an annual one-day music festival in Nottingham.

Aca-pocalypse 
Aca-pocalypse is a mixed auditioned A cappella group from the University of Nottingham. Having formed in October 2015, Aca-pocalypse reached the semi-finals of The Voice Festival UK in 2017.

Unplugged

 Unplugged  is a mixed auditioned A Cappella group from the University of Nottingham, formed in 2018. The group began with an aim to perform cheesy, guilty pleasure arrangements and started competing nationally in 2019. They have since competed annually in the International Championship of Collegiate A Cappella and were awarded third place in the National University Choir Competition 2021.

University of Oxford

The Men of Magdalen 
The Men of Magdalen are an acappella group composed of the Academical Clerks of The Choir of Magdalen College, Oxford. They perform at a variety of events and concerts, most notably at their yearly Carol performance at the Angel and Greyhound pub. The clerks perform a variety of music from Gaudete to Postman Pat to the highest standard.

The New Men 

The New Men is an A capella group made up of the choral scholars of The Choir of New College, Oxford. They sing a range of genres of music, from renaissance polyphony to Disney, barbershop, and pop. They perform over Christmas and in the Summer.

Out of the Blue 

Out of the Blue was formed in 2000 by postgraduate Derek Smith, who, having arrived in Oxford after an undergraduate degree at Harvard University, noticed the distinct lack of an all-male A cappella group at the university. Since their inception, they have become one of the most successful university groups in the UK, having toured the UK, Ireland, the United States, Japan, Sri Lanka and Scandinavia, and acquiring consecutive Fringe Sell-Out Awards at the Edinburgh Festival Fringe every year since 2006.

The group took part in the International Championship of Collegiate A Cappella (ICCAs) in 2009, progressing to the grand final in New York City, coming second. That year they also won the inaugural Voice Festival UK competition, the final of which they would go on to reach every year that they entered, winning again in 2014.

In 2011 they took part in Britain’s Got Talent and progressed to the live semifinals. They finished fourth in the fourth semifinal and therefore did not progress to the final.

In 2014, the group released a medley of Shakira songs, most notably Hips Don’t Lie, as a charity single on YouTube. The video was retweeted by Shakira, and has since reached over seven million views.

The Oxford Gargoyles 
The Oxford Gargoyles is a mixed-voice jazz A cappella group formed in 1998 by Divya Seshamani and Hannah Harper. They have toured the United States several times, appearing at Disneyland in Los Angeles and on NBC.

In 2007, the group won the Western European semifinal of the ICCAs and progressed to the final in New York. They won the Voice Festival UK in 2010.

In 2012, they won the Open Category of the Choir of the Year competition and performed at the finals, which were broadcast on BBC.

In 2014, the Gargoyles toured Hong Kong and Macau, performing at the first Oxford Asia Alumni Weekend, Cathay Pacific / HSBC Rugby Sevens Weekend, Hong Kong City Hall, Teatro Dom Pedro V, and more than a dozen other venues.

They have appeared at the Edinburgh Festival Fringe every year since 2006, and had a sell-out show in 2008.

The Oxford Belles 

The Oxford Belles is one of the two all-female A cappella groups from the University of Oxford. They were formed in 1995 by Helen Whiteley, a year-long visiting student from the University of Virginia who had previously sung with The Virginia Belles.

In 2009, the group reached the London final of the Voice Festival UK and were confirmed as the best female group that year. Following this success, they travelled to New York City later that year, and returned to America in 2010, this time to the West Coast and California.

In 2010 they took a show to the Edinburgh Festival Fringe for the first time since 2000 and received critical acclaim for their performances.

In 2012-2013 the Belles recorded and released a single and a music video. They competed in Voice Festival UK 2013 and received the award for "Outstanding Musicality".

The Oxford Alternotives 

The Oxford Alternotives is a mixed-voice A cappella group and the oldest A cappella group from the University of Oxford, having formed in 1993. They were founded as the Oxford University Alternative Singing Society by three students seeking an alternative to the chapel choirs dominating the university music scene at the time.

They have toured the US a number of times, including a performance at the 9/11 memorial service for British victims in New York in 2005. The group also appears every year at the Edinburgh Fringe, having received 5-stars in 2013.

In 2009, the group came second in the Voice Festival UK, winning awards for 'Outstanding Arrangement' and 'Outstanding Soloist', and again qualified for the national final as Oxford regional champions in 2013.

In The Pink 
In The Pink is one of the two all-female A cappella groups from the University of Oxford. They were formed in 2003.

In 2006, the group participated in the ICCAs in Western European semifinal in Oxford. They finished third, with Alexandra Godfree winning the award for 'Outstanding Arrangement' on "Rainy Days and Mondays". In 2007 they entered again, and despite not placing in the top three, Rebecca Dale won the award for 'Outstanding Vocal Percussion'. In 2008, the group participated again, this time in the first of two quarterfinals. This time Suzannah Merchant claimed the award for 'Outstanding Vocal Percussion'.

They have appeared at the Edinburgh Festival Fringe since 2005 and are set to do so again in 2013. As a result of their performance in 2010, they appeared on the Richard Bacon show on Radio 4.

The group have recorded five studio albums: Naked (2005), Tickled Pink (2006), All Mouth No Trousers (2007), By Any Other Name (2008), Pinkredible (2010) and their latest effort "She Who Dares" (2012). They competed in the Oxford round of the Voice Festival UK 2013 and received awards for 'Outstanding Performance' and 'Outstanding Soloist'.

In 2019, the group released 3 music videos: "Color Song/Fallingwater", "Havana X New Rules", and "My Songs Know What You Did in the Dark".

The Ultrasounds 
The Ultrasounds are an all-male A cappella group from the medical school of the University of Oxford. They formed in 2010 and made their competitive debut at The Voice Festival UK 2012 in the Oxford Regional Round, where they won 'Outstanding Overall Performance' and 'Best Vocal Percussionist'.

The Beatroots 
The Beatroots are an 8-strong mixed A cappella group of postgraduate students from the University of Oxford, formed in 2012. They were awarded 'Judges' Favourite Song' at the Voice Festival UK Community Showcase in 2014.

The Aneurhythms 
The Aneurhythms are a relatively new arrival (established 2014) to Oxford's roaring A cappella scene. However, since their conception they have taken the scene by storm, having been praised as the best all-female medical student A capella Oxford has to offer. The group have performed at a variety of student and charity events across Oxford, singing a variety of self-arranged repertoire from old classics to new pop mash ups.

The Oxford Commas 
The Oxford Commas are an all male A cappella group. Formed in November 2014, the group regularly performs a variety of gigs in and around Oxford, including at colleges, weddings and balls. The group initiated their first international tour to the east coast of the US in March 2017.

In November 2017, the group reached further heights when they appeared on Sing: Ultimate A Cappella, Sky TV's A cappella competition. They won their initial heat and progressed to the finals, eventually finishing in fifth place overall.

Royal Holloway, University of London

Absolute Harmony 
Absolute Harmony is a mixed-voice A cappella group formed in 1997 at Royal Holloway, University of London as 'Alternative Harmony' by Regina Yau, who did not feel there was much opportunity for the average student to sing in an informal, unauditioned choir. After the group disintegrated somewhat due to Yau taking a year abroad, she returned, influenced by several American collegiate A cappella groups and decided to convert the group into an A cappella group, with a smaller group of members meeting more often to form 'Absolute Harmony'. The group was instrumental in the inauguration of the first ever British Inter-collegiate Contemporary Championship of A Cappella (BICCAs).

Eventually the name of the entire group changed to 'Absolute Harmony', with a smaller group, 'Hardcore Harmony', meeting more regularly to work towards competitions.

University of Sheffield

Steelworks
Steelworks is the competition group of the University of Sheffield A Cappella and Beatbox Society, established by Sergio Filipe in 2014. The group took part in the Sky One competition Sing: Ultimate A Cappella, hosted by Cat Deeley, in 2017. Under Kaan Harwood, the group reached the quarter-finals of the ICCAs in 2019, their first year in the competition. In 2020, the group won their ICCA quarter-final, led by Johanna Stroud, to reach the UK finals in London. The group also boasts a barbershop quartet, Low Key, who were formed in 2018.

Factory A Cappella
Factory is the non-auditioned group of the University of Sheffield A Cappella and Beatbox Society.

University of St Andrews

The Other Guys 

The Other Guys was formed in 2004 and are the only all-male A cappella group from the University of St Andrews. They are perhaps best known for their YouTube hit "Royal Romance", a tribute to the wedding of Prince William and Catherine Middleton, which gained recognition in the rest of the United Kingdom, the United States, Australia, and India within a week, and the video also appeared on "Webtastic" on The Today Show.

The group entered the ICCAs for the first time in 2007, when St Andrews hosted the Western European quarterfinal, and progressed to the semifinal in London. They repeated this success in the following year. In 2009 they progressed to the London final of the inaugural Voice Festival UK competition.

The Alleycats 

The Alleycats is a mixed-voice A cappella group formed in 2001. Having originally been an all-male group, in 2007 girls were allowed to audition for the first time, and now the group consists of roughly half and half.

In 2008, the group appeared on the BBC's Last Choir Standing, making it to the final fifteen. The group also took a show to the Edinburgh Festival Fringe in 2010 and plan to do so in August 2011.

In 2009 and 2010, the group progressed to the final of the Voice Festival UK in London. In 2009, Lizzy Weintz won the award for 'Outstanding Arrangement' in the final. In 2010, the group received the 'Outstanding Performance' award.

The Accidentals 
The Accidentals is an all-female A cappella group.

In 2010 they progressed from the St Andrews semifinal of the Voice Festival UK to the London final having won the award for 'Outstanding Performance'. In 2011 they achieved this success again, with Anna McDonald winning the award for 'Outstanding Soloist' for her performance of Adele's Rolling in the Deep and Ellie Mason winning the award for 'Outstanding Vocal Percussion' at the semifinal. In the final, the group were highly commended for their arrangement of Price Tag, as well as their Vocal Percussion.

Scottish A Cappella Championships 2014 
Ellie Mason awarded Outstanding Arrangement.

Scottish A Cappella Championships 2015 
Awarded first place became Scottish Champions.

Scottish A Cappella Championships 2016 
Awarded third place

Scottish A Cappella Championships 2016
Stephanie Boyle awarded Outstanding Soloist.

Scottish A Cappella Championships 2017
Niamh Kidd awarded Outstanding Choreography

ICCA Semi Finals London 2015 
Awarded third Place

ICCA Quarter Finals Edinburgh 2017 
Awarded second Place

ICCA Quarter Finals Edinburgh 2018 
Awarded third Place

The Hummingbirds 
The Hummingbirds is an all-female A cappella group. They have competed in the Voice Festival UK since its inception in 2008. The group won the "Outstanding Choreography" award during the Scottish A Cappella Championship in 2015. The Hummingbirds made their debut at the Edinburgh Fringe Festival in 2016.

St Andrews Madrigal Group 
Formed in 1946 by student Evelyn Webb. The auditioned choir of sixteen sings madrigals as well as contemporary 'choral' A Capella by the likes of Eric Whitacre, Paul Mealor etc. In addition the group has for many decades sung choral arrangements of popular music, long before this style underwent something of a renaissance in the mid to late 1990s.

The Vocal Bandits
The Vocal Bandits are St Andrews' only non-auditioned A cappella group made up of both males and females.

References

External links 
 The Voice Festival Official Website
 The UK University A Cappella Blog

 
University musical groups in the United Kingdom